Prudence was built in Philadelphia in 1796. Between 1801 and 1803 she made two complete voyages from Liverpool as a slave ship but was captured around late 1803 on her third, and before she could purchase slaves.

Slave trading voyages
Prudence first appeared in the Register of Shipping {RS) in 1802.

On 6 January 1802 Prudence, Woodstock, master, sailed for Africa. She acquired slaves at Cape Grand Mount and arrived at Kingston on 6 April with 157 slaves. Prudence sailed from Kingston on 21 May and arrived back at Liverpool on 5 July. she had left Liverpool with 20 crew members and suffered three crew deaths on the voyage.

Captain James Swanson sailed from Liverpool on 5 September 1802. She began acquiring slaves in Africa on 1 November, and sailed from Africa on 3 January 1803. She arrived at Demerara on 10 March. She arrived back at Liverpool on 30 May. She had left Liverpool with 20 crew members and suffered eight crew deaths on the voyage.

Captain Johnathan D'Arcy acquired a letter of marque on 30 July 1803. He sailed from Liverpool on 7 September.

Fate

When  arrived at Demerara she brought news that , Dalrymple, master, and Prudence, Darby, master, had been captured on the Windward Coast.

Citations

1796 ships
Ships built in Philadelphia
Age of Sail merchant ships of England
Liverpool slave ships
Captured ships